Jay Cohen (born 1968) is the co-founder and former CEO of World Sports Exchange (WSEX), an online gambling company.

Biography
Cohen was raised on Long Island. He is Jewish. He graduated from U.C. Berkeley with a degree in nuclear engineering. He worked as options trader in San Francisco until 1996, when he moved to Antigua and opened the online gambling company World Sports Exchange (WSEX).

In 1998, attorney General Janet Reno charged him with violating the Federal Wire Act. Although Cohen was operating out of a jurisdiction where gambling was legal, his US customers used phone lines and the internet to place bets. On July 24, 2000, Cohen was the first United States citizen to be convicted in US Federal Court for violation of the Federal Wire Act for operating an online gambling company from a jurisdiction where it was legal and regulated (Antigua). He was sentenced to twenty-one months in prison and served his time at Nellis prison camp, 25 miles north of Las Vegas.

Cohen's case was appealed to the United States Supreme Court, but it refused to hear the appeal. He was released in March 2004.

See also
 David Carruthers and Gary Kaplan of BetonSports
 Peter Dicks of Sportingbet
 Howard Lederer, former CEO of Full Tilt Poker
 Neteller
 Nigel Payne
 Safe Port Act

References

1968 births
Living people
American casino industry businesspeople
American computer criminals
American Jews
UC Berkeley College of Engineering alumni
American chief executives